KTVD (channel 20) is a television station in Denver, Colorado, United States, affiliated with MyNetworkTV. It is owned by Tegna Inc. alongside NBC affiliate KUSA (channel 9). Both stations share studios on East Speer Boulevard in Denver's Speer neighborhood, while KTVD's transmitter is located atop Lookout Mountain (near Golden).

History
KTVD first signed on the air on December 1, 1988. Originally operating as an independent station, it maintained a general entertainment format featuring classic cartoons and sitcoms, old movies and religious programming. The station lost money throughout its first two years on the air, and its original owners filed the station for bankruptcy in August 1990. At one point, KTVD had only carried a few low-budget shows, religious programs and infomercials. The station began to turn a profit with the paid programming that aired, and gradually added a number of barter syndicated shows, such as cartoons, some older sitcoms and first-run talk shows, to its schedule. In March 1994, KTVD was purchased by Newsweb Corporation, operating under the licensee of Channel 20 TV Company, and emerged from bankruptcy.

On October 27, 1993, KTVD signed an agreement with United Television to become a charter affiliate of the United Paramount Network (UPN); that network began operations on January 16, 1995. Channel 20 TV Company acquired KTVS (channel 3, now KCDO-TV) in Sterling in 1999, and converted it into a satellite station of KTVD; that station changed its callsign to KUPN in 2002 to reflect its UPN affiliation.

On December 15, 2005, Newsweb Corporation announced the sale of KTVD to the Gannett Company, owners of NBC affiliate KUSA-TV (channel 9). This was despite rumors that Fox Television Stations (which owned Fox station KDVR (channel 31) at the time locally, and is the current owner of KTVD's former Chicago sister station WPWR-TV) would purchase the station to create a duopoly with KDVR; the transaction was finalized on June 26, 2006. Newsweb retained possession of KUPN, and converted it into an independent station in June 2006.

On January 24, 2006, CBS Corporation and Time Warner announced that the two companies would shut down UPN (which CBS had acquired one month earlier in December 2005 following its split from Viacom) and The WB and combine the respective programming from the two networks to create a new jointly-owned "fifth" network called The CW. As part of the announcement, the network signed a ten-year agreement with Tribune Broadcasting to affiliate with 13 of the 16 WB-affiliated stations that the company had owned at the time – including WB affiliate KWGN-TV (channel 2), which was named as the network's Denver charter affiliate.

Nearly one month later on February 22, 2006, News Corporation announced the launch of a new competing network, MyNetworkTV, which would be operated by its Fox Television Stations and Twentieth Television units. On July 12 of that year, the Gannett Company signed an affiliation agreement to make KTVD the Denver affiliate of MyNetworkTV; the station officially affiliated with the network upon MyNetworkTV's September 5, 2006 launch. As of November 2014, the station's website merely contains the MyNetworkTV default video portal, links to KUSA's website, and FCC-required public file reports.

Around the first week of October 2012, Gannett entered a dispute against Dish Network regarding compensation fees and Dish's AutoHop commercial-skip feature on its Hopper digital video recorders. Gannett ordered that Dish discontinue AutoHop on the account that it is affecting advertising revenues for KUSA and KTVD, thus taking a big chunk out of the pockets of potential advertisers in the Rocky Mountains. Gannett threatened to pull all of its stations (including KUSA and KTVD) should the skirmish continue beyond October 7 and Dish and Gannett fail to reach an agreement. The two parties eventually reached an agreement after extending the deadline for a few hours.

On June 29, 2015, Gannett split in two, with one side specializing in print media and the other side specializing in broadcast and digital media. KUSA and KTVD were retained by the latter company, named Tegna.

Programming
Syndicated programs broadcast by KTVD include The King of Queens, The People's Court, Judge Mathis, and 2 Broke Girls, among others.

Sports programming
KTVD also holds broadcast rights to NFL exhibition games featuring the Denver Broncos (sister station KUSA also carries Broncos games produced as part of NBC Sunday Night Football, though most regular season games air on KCNC). From 1991 to 1995, and for one night of the 2019–20 season (due to Altitude Sports being blacked out on virtually every provider), the station was also the local broadcast home of the NBA's Denver Nuggets. From 1995 to 2002 it was the broadcast home of the NHL's Colorado Avalanche. In 2003, the station became the local television broadcaster for the Colorado Rockies Major League Baseball franchise; the station lost the rights to the games after the 2008 season.

Newscasts
KUSA presently produces 20½ hours of locally produced newscasts each week for KTVD (with 3½ hours each weekday and 1½ hours each on Saturdays and Sundays). Combined with KUSA, 9 News broadcasts 55½ hours of local news, and has the second highest local newscast output in the state of Colorado behind Nexstar's KDVR and KWGN combined. To correspond with the affiliation switch to MyNetworkTV, KUSA began producing a daily half-hour prime time newscast at 9:00 p.m. for KTVD on September 5, 2006, to compete with newscasts seen in that timeslot on CW affiliate KWGN-TV and Fox owned-and-operated station (now affiliate) KDVR (KWGN later moved its prime time newscast to 7:00 p.m. in 2009). Exactly three months later on December 5, 2006, KUSA began producing a two-hour extension of its weekday morning newscast on the station. In 2010, KTVD began airing hour-long extensions of its weekend morning newscasts. In September 2010, the station debuted the 9News Daily Connection, a midday newscast at 11:00 a.m. on weekdays that was produced jointly by NBC News and KUSA (KTVD was the only television station that was not owned and operated by NBC to air the Daily Connection program). In July 2011, the program was replaced with a traditional newscast in the 11:00 a.m. slot.

KTVD will sometimes take on the responsibility of airing KUSA's newscasts whenever that station cannot do so because of NBC Sports telecasts that are scheduled to overrun into one of channel 9's regularly scheduled newscast timeslots; in particular, KUSA's 5:00 p.m. newscast on Sunday evenings may air on KTVD during the NFL season when KUSA airs NBC's Sunday Night Football pregame show Football Night in America.

Technical information

Subchannels
The station's digital signal is multiplexed: 

On January 10, 2011, KTVD began carrying Universal Sports on its second digital subchannel; the network moved to digital channel 20.2 from KUSA's 9.3 subchannel in order to balance out the bandwidth of both stations. Universal Sports transitioned from a digital multicast network into a cable and satellite service on January 1, 2012, resulting in KTVD replacing the network with the classic television service MeTV. On February 1, 2020, MeTV was replaced with Heroes & Icons.

In late January 2015, KTVD's main signal was converted to 720p (MyNetworkTV's default transmission format), and KTVD's third subchannel was launched to become a UHF simulcast of KUSA, which allows homes with issues receiving KUSA's channel 9 VHF signal or only a UHF antenna to receive KUSA in some form. Instead of channel 20.3, KTVD-DT3 maps to channel 9.4.

Analog-to-digital conversion
KTVD shut down its analog signal, over UHF channel 20, on June 12, 2009, the official date in which full-power television stations in the United States transitioned from analog to digital broadcasts under federal mandate. The station's digital signal remained on its pre-transition UHF channel 19. Through the use of PSIP, digital television receivers display the station's virtual channel as its former UHF analog channel 20.

Translators

References

External links

KTVD-DT2 website

TVD
MyNetworkTV affiliates
Heroes & Icons affiliates
Twist (TV network) affiliates
Tegna Inc.
Television channels and stations established in 1988
1988 establishments in Colorado
National Hockey League over-the-air television broadcasters
Former Gannett subsidiaries